Kamaladdin Heydarov Fattah oglu (born 15 July 1961) is an Azerbaijani politician, businessperson and composer serving as the Minister of Emergency Situations. He has close ties to the ruling Aliyev family in Azerbaijan. BBC News described Heydarov as among "the wealthiest and most powerful in the governing elite" in Azerbaijan.

Early life
Heydarov was born on 15 July 1961 in Nakhchivan City, Azerbaijan. He has graduated from Baku State University with a degree in Geography. In 1992, he left Azerbaijan for Uzbekistan and opened several business firms. Heydarov is also a composer with some of his songs becoming hits in Azerbaijan. His compositions are produced under the name Kamal. His latest album is called Sənə güvəndiyim dağlar. His songs have been performed by famous singers such as Flora Kerimova, Ilhama Guliyeva, Aygun Kazimova, Zulfiyya Khanbabayeva.

Political career
Heydarov was appointed the Chairman of State Customs Committee by former President Heydar Aliyev in 1995. In this role he was widely reported to have extracted bribes from companies importing goods to Azerbaijan.

On February 6, 2006 Heydarov was appointed the Minister of Emergency Situations, a newly formed ministry to handle the emergency situations and protection of the civil population in Azerbaijan.

BBC News described Heydarov as among "the wealthiest and most powerful in the governing elite" in Azerbaijan. According to a 2010 leaked US diplomatic cable, Heydarov accrued "massive wealth" as chairman of the Azerbaijan customs agency, “an agency that is notoriously corrupt, even by Azerbaijani standards.”

He founded a company called Gilan in the 1980s, but the details about the company are opaque.

Daphne Project scandal 
Heydarov was implicated in the Daphne Project investigation into secretive investments across Europe and the Middle-East through a Maltese bank.

Personal life
Heydarov is married. He and his wife have two children, Nijat and Tale.

See also
Cabinet of Azerbaijan

References 

1961 births
Living people
Government ministers of Azerbaijan
People from the Nakhchivan Autonomous Republic
Azerbaijani composers
Baku State University alumni
Recipients of the Azerbaijani Flag Order